HD 49674 is a solar-type star with an exoplanetary companion in the northern constellation of Auriga. It has an apparent visual magnitude of 8.10 and thus is an eighth-magnitude star that is too faint to be readily visible to the naked eye. The system is located at a distance of 140.6 light-years from the Sun based on parallax, and is drifting further away with a radial velocity of +12 km/s.

HD 49674, and its planetary system, was chosen as part of the 2019 NameExoWorlds campaign organised by the International Astronomical Union, which assigned each country a star and planet to be named. HD 49674 was assigned to Belgium. The winning proposal named the star Nervia and the planet Eburonia, both after prominent Belgic tribes, the Nervii and Eburones, respectively.

This is an ordinary G-type main-sequence star with a stellar classification of G3V, which indicates it is generating energy through hydrogen fusion at its core. Spinning with a projected rotational velocity of 4.7 km/s, it is younger than the Sun, roughly two billion years of age, and is a metal-rich star. HD 49674 has a similar mass and radius as the Sun.

Planetary system
At the time of discovery of the planet HD 49674 b in 2002, it was the least massive planet known, very close to the boundary between sub-Jupiter mass and Neptune mass at 0.1 MJ.

See also
 Lists of exoplanets

References

External links
 
 HIP 32916 Catalog
 Image HD 49674

G-type main-sequence stars
Planetary systems with one confirmed planet

Auriga (constellation)
Durchmusterung objects
049674
032916